Philippa Gregory  (born 9 January 1954) is an English historical novelist who has been publishing since 1987. The best known of her works is The Other Boleyn Girl (2001), which in 2002 won the Romantic Novel of the Year Award from the Romantic Novelists' Association and has been adapted into two films.

AudioFile magazine has called Gregory "the queen of British historical fiction".

Early life and education
Philippa Gregory was born on 9 January 1954 in Nairobi, at that time serving as capital city of the Colony and Protectorate of Kenya (modern-day Republic of Kenya), the second daughter of Elaine (Wedd) and Arthur Percy Gregory, a radio operator and navigator for East African Airways. When she was two years old, her family moved to Bristol, England.

She was a "rebel" at Colston's Girls' School where she obtained a B grade in English and two E grades in History and Geography at A-level. She then went to journalism college in Cardiff and spent a year as an apprentice with the Portsmouth News before she managed to gain a place on an English literature degree course at the University of Sussex, where she switched to a history course. In 1982, she received a B.A. degree in history from Sussex University. 

She worked for BBC radio for two years before attending University of Edinburgh, where she obtained a Ph.D. degree in 18th-century literature in 1985 for her thesis entitled "The popular fiction of eighteenth-century commercial circulating libraries". Gregory has taught at the University of Durham, University of Teesside, and the Open University, and was made a Fellow of Kingston University in 1994.

Career

Writing
She has written novels set in several different historical periods, though primarily the Tudor period and the 16th century. Reading a number of novels set in the 17th century led her to write the best-selling Lacey trilogy Wideacre, which is a story about the love of land and incest, The Favoured Child and Meridon. This was followed by The Wise Woman. A Respectable Trade, a novel of the slave trade in England, set in 18th-century Bristol, was adapted by Gregory for a four-part drama series for BBC television. Gregory's script was nominated for a BAFTA, won an award from the Committee for Racial Equality, and the film was shown worldwide.

Two novels about a gardening family are set during the English Civil War: Earthly Joys and Virgin Earth, while she has in addition written contemporary fiction – Perfectly Correct, Mrs Hartley and the Growth Centre, The Little House and Zelda's Cut. She has also written for children.

Some of her novels have won awards and have been adapted into television dramas. The most successful of her novels has been The Other Boleyn Girl, published in 2001 and adapted for BBC television in 2003 with Natascha McElhone, Jodhi May and Jared Harris. In the year of its publication, The Other Boleyn Girl also won the Romantic Novel of the Year and it has subsequently spawned sequels – The Queen's Fool, The Virgin's Lover, The Constant Princess, The Boleyn Inheritance, and The Other Queen. Miramax bought the film rights to The Other Boleyn Girl and released a film of the same name in February 2008.

Gregory has also published a series of books about the Plantagenets, the ruling houses that preceded the Tudors, and the Wars of the Roses. Her first book The White Queen, published in 2009, centres on the life of Elizabeth Woodville the wife of Edward IV. The Red Queen, published in 2010, is about Margaret Beaufort the mother of Henry VII and grandmother to Henry VIII. The Lady of the Rivers (2011), is the life of Jacquetta of Luxembourg, mother of Elizabeth Woodville. The Kingmaker's Daughter, published in 2012, is about Anne Neville, the wife of Richard III, and The White Princess (2013) centres on the life of Elizabeth of York, wife of Henry VII and the mother of Henry VIII. The latest work is the 2017 novel The Last Tudor. The 2013 BBC One television series The White Queen is a 10-part adaptation of Gregory's novels The White Queen, The Red Queen and The Kingmaker's Daughter (2012).

In 2013, Helen Brown of The Telegraph wrote that "Gregory has made an impressive career out of breathing passionate, independent life into the historical noblewomen whose personalities had previously lain flat on family trees, remembered only as diplomatic currency and brood mares." She added, "Gregory’s historical fiction has always been entertainingly speculative (those tempted to sneer should note that she’s never claimed otherwise) and comes with lashings of romantic licence."

In 2011 she contributed a short story "Why Holly Berries are as Red as Roses" to an anthology supporting the Woodland Trust. The anthology, Why Willows Weep has so far helped The Woodland Trust plant approximately 50,000 trees.

Gregory was appointed Commander of the Order of the British Empire (CBE) in the 2021 Birthday Honours for services to literature and to charity in the UK and the Gambia.

Criticism
Gregory has said that her "commitment to historical accuracy" is a hallmark of her writing. This is disputed by historians. Historian David Starkey, appearing alongside Gregory in a documentary about Anne Boleyn, described her work as "good Mills and Boon", adding that: "We really should stop taking historical novelists seriously as historians. The idea that they have authority is ludicrous." Susan Bordo criticised Gregory's claims to historical accuracy as "self-deceptive and self-promoting chutzpah", and notes that it is not so much the many inaccuracies in her work as "Gregory's insistence on her meticulous adherence to history that most aggravates the scholars."

In her novel The Other Boleyn Girl, her portrayal of Henry VIII's second wife Anne Boleyn drew criticism. The novel depicts Anne as cold and ruthless, as well as strongly implying that the accusations that she committed adultery and incest with her brother were true, despite it being widely accepted that she was innocent of the charges. Novelist Robin Maxwell refused on principle to write a blurb for this book, describing its characterisation of Anne as "vicious, unsupportable".

Media

She is a frequent contributor to magazines and newspapers, with short stories, features and reviews. She is also a frequent broadcaster and a regular contestant on Round Britain Quiz for BBC Radio 4 and the Tudor expert for Channel 4's Time Team. She won the 29 December 2008 edition of Celebrity Mastermind on BBC1, taking Elizabeth Woodville as her specialist subject.

Philanthropy

Gregory runs a small charity building wells in school gardens in The Gambia. Gardens for The Gambia was established in 1993 when Gregory was in The Gambia, researching for her book A Respectable Trade.

Since then the charity has dug almost 200 low technology, low budget and therefore easily maintained wells, which are on-stream and providing water to irrigate school and community gardens to provide meals for the poorest children and harvest a cash crop to buy school equipment, seeds and tools.

In addition to wells, the charity has piloted a successful bee-keeping scheme, funded feeding programmes and educational workshops in batik and pottery and is working with larger donors to install mechanical boreholes in some remote areas of the country where the water table is not accessible by digging alone.

Philippa Gregory is a patron of The UK Chagos Support Association, which supports the Chagos islanders in their legal disputes with the British government. The people of Chagos were relocated by the British government when  the archipelago in the Indian Ocean was cleared in the 1960s and 1970s to make way for an important U.S. airbase. Gregory often speaks about the Chagossians' situation and lobbies the government to take action.

Personal life

Gregory wrote her first novel Wideacre while completing her doctorate and lived during that time in a cottage on the Pennine Way with her first husband Peter Chislett, editor of the Hartlepool Mail, and their baby daughter, Victoria. They divorced before the book was published.

Following the success of Wideacre and the publication of The Favoured Child, she moved south to near Midhurst, West Sussex, where the Wideacre trilogy was set. Here Gregory married Paul Carter, her second husband, with whom she has a son, named Adam. She divorced for a second time.

After the break-up of her second marriage, she met and married Anthony Mason, whom she had first met during her time in Hartlepool.

Gregory now lives on a  farm in the North York Moors National Park, with her husband, children and stepchildren (six in all). Her interests include riding, walking, skiing, and gardening.

Works

Novels 
The Wideacre trilogy
 Wideacre (1987)
 The Favoured Child (1989)
 Meridon (1990)

Tradescant series
 Earthly Joys (1998)
 Virgin Earth (1999)

The Plantagenet and Tudor novels
Previously separated as the Tudor Court and Cousins' War series, as of August 2016 Gregory lists these novels as one series, The Plantagenet and Tudor Novels.
 The Other Boleyn Girl (2001)
 The Queen's Fool (2003)
 The Virgin's Lover (2004)
 The Constant Princess (2005)
 The Boleyn Inheritance (2006)
 The Other Queen (2008)
  The White Queen  (2009)
  The Red Queen (2010)
 The Lady of the Rivers (2011)
 The Kingmaker's Daughter (2012)
 The White Princess (2013)
 The King's Curse (2014)
 The Taming of the Queen (2015)
 Three Sisters, Three Queens (2016)
 The Last Tudor (2017)

Gregory has suggested a "reading order" for the series, based on the real-world chronology of historical figures and events.
 The Lady of the Rivers (Jacquetta of Luxembourg)
 The White Queen (Elizabeth Woodville)
 The Red Queen (Margaret Beaufort)
 The Kingmaker's Daughter (Anne Neville; featuring her sister Isabel)
 The White Princess (Elizabeth of York)
 The Constant Princess (Katherine of Aragon)
 The King's Curse (Margaret Pole)
 Three Sisters, Three Queens (Margaret Tudor, featuring Mary Tudor and Katherine of Aragon)
 The Other Boleyn Girl (Mary and Anne Boleyn)
 The Boleyn Inheritance (Jane Boleyn, Anne of Cleves and Katherine Howard)
 The Taming of the Queen (Kateryn Parr)
 The Queen's Fool (A young Jewish girl's story of her service in the courts of Edward VI, Mary I and Elizabeth I)
 The Last Tudor (Jane, Katherine and Mary Grey)
 The Virgin's Lover (Elizabeth I, Robert Dudley and Amy Robsart)
 The Other Queen (Mary, Queen of Scots, George Talbot and Bess of Hardwick)

The Order of Darkness series
 Changeling (2012)
 Stormbringers (2013)
 Fools' Gold (2014)
 Dark Tracks (2018)

Fairmile series
 Tidelands (2019)
 Dark Tides (2020)
 Dawnlands (2022)

Stand-alones
 Mrs. Hartley and the Growth Centre, or Alice Hartley's Happiness (1992)
 The Wise Woman (1992)
 A young girl forced out of her nunnery and into the real world during the reformation during Anne Boleyn's time of being queen.
 Fallen Skies (1994)
 A Respectable Trade (1995)
 Perfectly Correct (1996)
 The Little House (1998)
 Zelda's Cut (2000)

Short stories 

Collections:
 Bread and Chocolate (2000)

Children's books 

Princess Florizella series (picture books):
 Princess Florizella (1988)
 Florizella and the Wolves (1991)
 Florizella and the Giant (1992)

Stand-alones:
 Diggory and the Boa Conductor (1996), picture book
 The Little Pet Dragon (1997), picture book
 A Pirate Story (1999), picture book

Non-fiction 

 The Women of the Cousins' War: The Duchess, the Queen and the King's Mother (2011), with David Baldwin and Michael Jones, history

Adaptations 

 A Respectable Trade (1998), drama directed by Suri Krishnamma, based on novel A Respectable Trade
 The Other Boleyn Girl (2003), telefilm directed by Philippa Lowthorpe, based on novel The Other Boleyn Girl
 The Other Boleyn Girl (2008), film directed by Justin Chadwick, based on novel The Other Boleyn Girl
 The Little House (2010), miniseries directed by Jamie Payne, based on novel The Little House
 The White Queen (2013), drama directed by Colin Teague, James Kent and Jamie Payne, based on novels The White Queen, The Red Queen and The Kingmaker's Daughter
 The White Princess (2017), miniseries directed by Jamie Payne and Alex Kalymnios, based on novel The White Princess
 The Spanish Princess (2019-2020), series directed by Birgitte Stærmose, Daina Reid, Lisa Clarke, Stephen Woolfenden, Chanya Button and Rebecca Gatward, based on novels The Constant Princess and The King's Curse

References

External links 

 
 

1954 births
Living people
Academics of Teesside University
Academics of Durham University
Academics of the Open University
Alumni of the University of Edinburgh
Alumni of the University of Sussex
English historical novelists
English women novelists
People educated at Montpelier High School, Bristol
Writers from Bristol
Writers of historical fiction set in the early modern period
Writers of historical romances
RoNA Award winners
British republicans
20th-century English novelists
21st-century British novelists
20th-century English women writers
21st-century English women writers
Women romantic fiction writers
Women historical novelists
Commanders of the Order of the British Empire